Carimonte Banca was an Italian bank based in Bologna, Emilia–Romagna region. The bank was formed on 12 July 1991 (gazetted on 21 August) by the merger of Banca del Monte di Bologna e Ravenna and Cassa di Risparmio di Modena. On 31 December 1995 was merged with Credito Romagnolo (a subsidiary of Credito Italiano) to form Rolo Banca.

In 1995 the bank also acquired a minority interests in Banca Popolare di Rieti.

History
The predecessor of the bank could be traced back to Mount of Piety of Bologna, found 1473, which was merged with Mount of Piety of Ravenna (found 1492) to form Banca del Monte di Bologna e Ravenna in 1966. In 1991 Carimonte Banca was formed by the merger of the Banca Monte and Cassa di Risparmio di Modena (found 1846). The holding company of the bank was Carimonte Holding, a joint venture of Fondazione Carimodena and Fondazione del Monte di Bologna e Ravenna in 50–50 voting rights and 60–40 share capitals.

Sponsorship
The bank was a sponsor of Modena Volley.

References

Defunct banks of Italy
Credito Italiano Group
Banks established in 1991
Italian companies established in 1991
Banks disestablished in 1995
Italian companies disestablished in 1995
Companies based in Bologna
Mounts of piety